John Vig (born 31 May 1942) is a physicist, executive and inventor. His career has been with the U.S. Army Research Lab and he has also been active with the IEEE and is known for his inventions in UV-ozone cleaning, chemical polishing of quartz surfaces, polyimide bonding of resonators and noise in MEMS.

Early life and education
Born in Budapest to a Jewish family during World War II, he survived The Holocaust and left Hungary with his immediate family during the  Hungarian Revolution in 1956. He settled in New York City with his family in 1957 and subsequently received a B.S. degree from City College New York in 1964. In 1969 he received a Ph.D. in Physics from Rutgers University. After graduating he began his professional career at the Electronic Components Laboratory at Fort Monmouth.

Career
He has served the IEEE in multiple roles, including: 
 IEEE President and CEO. 
 President of the Ultrasonics, Ferroelectrics, and Frequency Control Society (UFFC-S)
 Founding President of the Sensors Council 
 Division Director, Member of the Board of Directors 
He was elected Fellow of the IEEE in 1988 "for contributions to the technology of quartz crystals for precision frequency control and timing."

While in senior management roles in the IEEE, John focused heavily on key issues affecting the organization as demographics, technologies and globalization shifted the environment in which it operated. A key example was the management of diversity as the membership shifted away from being primarily a US-based organization. Another example was helping to kick-start the Internet of Things journal after having founded the Sensors Journal.

References 

Living people
1942 births
Jewish physicists
Jewish Hungarian scientists
Holocaust survivors
Semiconductor physicists
People from Colts Neck Township, New Jersey
Rutgers University alumni